The Sotajumala MCD was released by Sotajumala in 2001. Recorded and mixed by Tuomo Valtonen at Sundicoop studios. Artwork by A. Romo.

Track listing
"Sotajumala"
"Pelkuri" (THE COWARD)
"105 Päivää" (105 DAYS)
"Verimaa, Isänmaa" (BLOODLAND, FATHERLAND)

2001 albums
Sotajumala albums